The Patent Act of 1952 clarified and simplified existing U.S. patent law. It also effected substantive changes, including the codification of the requirement for non-obviousness and the judicial doctrine of contributory infringement. As amended, it is codified in Title 35 of the United States Code.

Provisions

The Act originally divided the patent law into three parts:

Part I — Patent and Trademark Office  contains provisions governing that Office, its powers and duties, and related matters.
Part II — Patentability of Invention and Grant of Patents  sets out when and how patents may be obtained.
Part III — Patents and Protection of Patent Rights  relates to the patents themselves and the protection of rights under patents.

A later amendment added

Part IV — Patent Cooperation Treaty  Intended to simplify the filing of patent applications for an invention in different countries, the Patent Cooperation Treaty, signed by 35 countries by December 31, 1970, provides (inter alia) centralized filing procedures and a standardized application format. It helps expand established programs of American industry to file foreign patent applications, and encourages smaller businesses and individual investors to become more active in seeking patent protection abroad.

Other amendments to Title 35 concern the renaming from "Patent Office" to "Patent and Trademark Office"; revised fee schedules for application and issue of patents; and modifications in procedures related to the protection of patents.

References

1952 in law
United States federal patent legislation